Railio is a Finnish surname. Notable people with the surname include:

Antti Railio (born 1984), Finnish rock and pop rock singer 
Eino Railio (1886–1970), Finnish gymnast

See also
Raili

Finnish-language surnames